The 2012 Energiewacht Tour was the second edition of the Energiewacht Tour women's cycling stage race. It was rated by the UCI as category 2.2, and was held between 4 and 8 April 2012 in the Netherlands.

The tour was won by Ina-Yoko Teutenberg ahead of Ellen van Dijk and Marianne Vos.

Stages

Stage 1
4 April 2012 – Appingedam to Appingedam (individual time trial), 
It was really cold for the time of the year. The individual time trial was, unsurprisingly, dominated by time trial specialists.

Stage 2
5 April 2012 – Bad Nieuweschans to Bad Nieuweschans, 
Stage 2 started with the peloton being held up behind a level-crossing. The pace was kept high, with Rabobank doing a lot of work. Armstrong's Team USA tried hard to pull the group back, but with that group working together, they had no chance. The front group finished 3' 44" ahead of the chasers and coming down to a bunch sprint, won by Ina-Yoko Teutenberg. Vos' intermediate sprints and stage placings took her into the lead for the general classification.

Stage 3
6 April 2012 – Midwolda to Midwolda, 
The third was six laps around a lake and it started with sunshine. There were attacks from the start, although they were neutralised in time for Vos to take the early sprint points then a break of about twenty riders. They were caught, and Vos took more points. Later a break group got away with some serious threats like Kirsten Wild, Chantal Blaak and Lizzie Armitstead (AA Drink–leontien.nl) and Judith Arndt (GreenEdge) but not a single Rabobank rider, and none of the big Specialized–lululemon general classificatn threats. Marianne Vos was on the front, pulling back the break, and Rabo got in some practice for the next day's team time trial. The break tried their best, but were caught and Specialized–lululemon took their turn on the front, with a huge pull from Ellen van Dijk stretched out the peloton, and trains started to form on both sides of the road but once again, Ina-Yoko Teutenberg took the bunch sprint.

Stage 4a
7 April 2012 – Winsum to Winsum,

Stage 4b
7 April 2012 – Veendam to Oude Pekela (Team Time Trial,

Stage 5
8 April 2012 – Slochteren to Slochteren,

Final classifications

General classification

Points classification

Youth classification

See also
 2012 in women's road cycling

References

External links

Engergiewacht Tour
Engergiewacht Tour
Healthy Ageing Tour